The 1987 Ebel German Open was a men's tennis tournament that was part of the Super Series of the 1987 Nabisco Grand Prix circuit. It was the 78th edition of the event and was played on outdoor clay courts at the Am Rothenbaum in Hamburg, West Germany from 27 April until 3 May 1987. First-seeded Ivan Lendl won the singles title.

Finals

Singles
 Ivan Lendl defeated  Miloslav Mečíř 6–1, 6–3, 6–3
 It was Lendl's 1st singles title of the year and the 63rd of his career.

Doubles
 Miloslav Mečíř /  Tomáš Šmíd defeated  Claudio Mezzadri /  Jim Pugh 4–6, 7–6, 6–2

References

External links
   
 ATP tournament profile
 ITF tournament editions details

German Open
Hamburg European Open
1987 in West German sport
German